A charnel house is a vault or building where human skeletal remains are stored. They are often built near churches for depositing bones that are unearthed while digging graves. The term can also be used more generally as a description of a place filled with death and destruction.

The term is borrowed from Middle French charnel, from Late Latin carnāle ("graveyard"), from Latin carnālis ("of the flesh").

Africa, Europe, and Asia 
In countries where ground suitable for burial was scarce, corpses would be interred for approximately five years following death, thereby allowing decomposition to occur. After this, the remains would be exhumed and moved to an ossuary or charnel house, thereby allowing the original burial place to be reused. In modern times, the use of charnel houses is a characteristic of cultures living in rocky or arid places, such as the Cyclades archipelago and other Greek islands in the Aegean Sea.

Monastery of the Transfiguration (Saint Catherine's), Mount Sinai 

Saint Catherine's Monastery in the Sinai is famous for having a working charnel house. Saint Catherine's was founded by Justinian in the early 6th century, on the site of an older monastery founded about 313 AD and named for Helena of Constantinople. The monastery comprises the whole Autonomous Church of Sinai, under the Patriarchate of Jerusalem. The site lies at the foot of  what some believe to be the biblical Mount Sinai where Jews, Christians, and Moslems believe Moses received the Ten Commandments.

Since the Sinai is an inhospitable place, the brethren of St. Catherine's have struggled to eke out a subsistence-level existence. The difficulty in establishing a large cemetery in the rocky ground notwithstanding, relics are also gathered for temporal and spiritual reasons: a reminder to the monks of their impending death and fate in the hereafter. The Archbishop of Saint Catherine's is commonly the Abbot as well. After death, he is afforded the dignity of a special niche within the "Skull-House".

North America 
A charnel house is also a structure commonly seen in some Native American societies of the Eastern United States. Major examples are the Hopewell cultures and Mississippian cultures. These houses were used specifically for mortuary services and, although they required many more resources to build and maintain than a crypt, they were widely used. They offered privacy and shelter as well as enough workspace for mortuary proceedings. These proceedings included cremation (in the included crematorium) as well as defleshing of the body before the cremation. Once the houses had served their purpose, they were burned to the ground and covered by earth, creating a sort of burial mound. Anthropologist William F. Romain in Mysteries of the Hopewell notes that these charnel houses were built in the form of a square, and their diagonals could be aligned to the direction of maximum and minimum moon-sets both north and south.

England 
Charnel houses do not appear to have been common in England. The earliest reference found to a charnel house was in the parish of St Mary-at-Hill in London, during the sixteenth century. Few other charnel houses are attested in the seventeenth century, usually within overcrowded urban contexts.

See also 
 Mortuary house
 Ossuary

References

Sources
 Papaioannou, Evangelos (1980) The Monastery of St. Catherine, Sinai, St. Catherine's Monastery: Guidebook, 48 pp., Cairo: Isis Press.

External links 
 

Burial monuments and structures
Native American religion